Glyphidocera wrightorum is a moth in the family Autostichidae. It was described by Adamski and Metzler in 2000. It is found in North America, where it has been recorded from Indiana and Ohio.

References

Moths described in 2000
Glyphidocerinae